Tecomella undulata is a tree species, locally known as rohida, found in Oman, and from southwest Iran to northwest India. It is the only species in the monotypic genus Tecomella. It is a medium-sized tree that produces quality timber and is the main source of timber amongst the indigenous tree species of desert regions of Shekhawati and Marwar in Rajasthan. The trade name of the tree species is desert teak or Marwar teak.

References

ROHIDA (Tecomella undulata), Indian Council of Forestry Research and Education, Dehradun
Conservation status Patrika News in Hindi
 Yahy M. Musakhel 2005: Floral diversity of Tecomella undulata species in Balochistan Pakistan.

Bignoniaceae
Flora of Oman
Flora of Iran
Flora of Afghanistan
Flora of the Indian subcontinent
Drought-tolerant trees
Monotypic Lamiales genera
Symbols of Rajasthan
Bignoniaceae genera